Jones Family Historic District is a national historic district located at Islandia, Florida in the Biscayne National Park. It includes the homesite and the agricultural structures on Porgy Key and Totten Key.

It was added to the National Register of Historic Places in 2014.

References

National Register of Historic Places in Miami-Dade County, Florida
Historic districts on the National Register of Historic Places in Florida
National Register of Historic Places in Biscayne National Park